Dietrich or Theoderic of Oldenburg ( – 14 February 1440) was a feudal lord in Northern Germany, holding the counties of Delmenhorst and Oldenburg. He was called "Fortunatus", as he was able to secure Delmenhorst for his branch of the Oldenburgs.

Dietrich was the father of Christian I of Denmark, who would go on to start the current dynasty of the Danish throne.

Lineage
Dietrich of Oldenburg was the son of Christian V of Oldenburg, who became the Count circa 1398 and died in 1403. His mother was the Countess Agnes of Honstein. His grandfather, Conrad I of Oldenburg, who died circa 1368, left his lands divided between Dietrich's father and uncle, Conrad II.

Dietrich’s father, Christian V, managed to gain the upper hand when Conrad II's son Maurice II died in 1420. After this, most of the Oldenburg family patrimony was under the rule of Dietrich’s branch. However, the house had several minor branches with estates and claims, as was usual in any medieval fief.

Dietrich of Oldenburg was the grandson of Ingeborg of Itzehoe, a Holstein princess who had married Count Conrad I of Oldenburg. After the death of her only brother, Count Gerhard V of Holstein-Itzehoe-Plön  in 1350, Ingeborg and her issue were the heirs of her grandmother Ingeborg of Sweden (d. ca. 1290, the first wife of Gerhard II of Holstein-Plön), the eldest daughter of King Valdemar of Sweden and Queen Sophia, who herself was the eldest daughter of King Eric IV of Denmark and his wife Jutta of Saxony who had no male descendants. Since there were no other living legitimate descendants of King Valdemar by this time, Dietrich was considered the heir general of Kings Valdemar I of Sweden and Eric IV of Denmark.

Dietrich succeeded his father as head of the House of Oldenburg in 1403.

Marriages and children
During his childhood, Dietrich married a distant cousin, the Countess Adelheid of Oldenburg-Delmenhorst, daughter of Oldenburg Count Otto IV of Delmenhorst, for reasons of succession and uniting the hereditary fiefs. Countess Adelheid is presumed to have died in 1404. In 1423, Dietrich married again, to Helvig of Schauenburg (born between 1398–1400 and died in 1436), widow of Prince Balthasar of Mecklenburg and daughter of the murdered Duke Gerhard VI of Schleswig and Holstein and his wife Elisabeth of Brunswick and, thus, sister of the reigning Duke Adolf VIII. All his legitimate children were born by his second wife.

His second marriage strengthened this interest in the Scandinavian monarchies since Helvig was a descendant of King Eric V of Denmark, King Haakon V of Norway and King Magnus I of Sweden.

At this time, Scandinavia was ruled by the Kalmar Union, established by Queen Margarethe I of Denmark. In 1387, she had lost her heir Olav IV of Norway, who was succeeded as heir by Eric of Pomerania and his sister Catherine, who was married to a prince of the Palatinate and Bavaria.

Dietrich of Oldenburg is said to have been a rival claimant to the crowns of Sweden and Denmark during the reign of Eric VII/Eric XIII, whose succession was through Christopher I of Denmark, the younger brother of the murdered Eric IV, and through Magnus I of Sweden, younger brother of the deposed King Valdemar.

Count Theodoric had three surviving sons and one daughter:

Christian (1426–1481); who succeeded him as Count of Oldenburg and Delmenhorst, and later became King Christian I of Denmark, Norway, and Sweden (following the deposition of Charles VII of Sweden), as well as Duke of Schleswig and Holstein. He would found the House of Oldenburg Dynasty in Denmark that still rules to this day.

Maurice V of Delmenhorst (1428–1464); when his elder brother became king, he was given the County of Delmenhorst.

Gerhard VI, Count of Oldenburg (1430–1500); two years after his eldest brother had become king, he was given the county of Oldenburg, and from his other brother's heirs, he also inherited Delmenhorst in about 1483. The third son got his name from usages of the mother's Holstein clan.

Adelheid (1425–1475), first married Ernest III, the Count of Hohnstein (d. 1454) and then, in 1474, Gerhard VI, Count of Mansfeld (d. 1492).

Male line of descendants
Dietrich of Oldenburg is a direct ancestor of the Danish royal family having given birth to the first House of Oldenburg King of Denmark, Christian I. He is also a direct ancestor of the British Royal Family, the pretenders to the Kingdom of the Hellenes, the Norwegian royal family, and the last Russian czars of Romanov-Holstein-Gottorp.

Ancestry

Notes
Alternate names include:
Medieval Latin: Teudericus de Oldenburg
Medieval Scandinavian: Didrik af Oldenborg
German: Dietrich von Oldenburg
Medieval French: Thierry d'Oldenbourg

References

Counts of Oldenburg
1390s births
1440 deaths

Archaeologisches Landesmuseum/Bibliothek - Schloß Gottorf, Schleswig